Marianne Sjöblom (22 November 1933 – 10 October 2014) was a Finnish fencer. She competed in the women's individual foil event at the 1952 Summer Olympics.

References

1933 births
2014 deaths
Finnish female foil fencers
Olympic fencers of Finland
Fencers at the 1952 Summer Olympics
Sportspeople from Helsinki